Jackson Haines (1840–1875) was an American ballet dancer and figure skater who is regarded as the father of modern figure skating.

Life
Haines was a trained ballet dancer. When he was a young man, he performed in skating exhibitions and on the variety stages. At this time, figure skating was performed in the "English style", which was rigid and formal, unlike what is performed today. Haines's style was in complete contrast; he used his ballet background to create graceful programs, and introduced accompanying music, an innovation. He also screwed his figure skates directly onto his boots, which added stability and allowed him to do more athletic leaps and jumps. The common practice of the time was to strap the blades onto the boot, but direct attachments of skates based on the designs of the accomplished skater and author, "Captain" Robert Jones had been manufactured in London as early as 1772.

Haines's style was not well received in the United States. He went to Europe to display and teach it, which became known as the "International style". He lived in Vienna for a time, where his skating became popular.

Haines died of tuberculosis and pneumonia in Gamlakarleby (nowadays in Finnish: Kokkola, in Swedish: Karleby), Finland in 1875.

Haines was inducted into the World Figure Skating Hall of Fame and the United States Figure Skating Hall of Fame in 1976.

Legacy
Haines was the inventor of the sit spin, one of the three basic spin types. The other two are the upright spin, about as old as the art of ice skating itself; and the camel spin, invented during the twentieth century by Cecilia Colledge. His style did not become popular in the United States until many years after his death. The first American figure skating championships in the "International Style" were held on March 20, 1914, in New Haven, Connecticut.

See also
List of people considered father or mother of a field

References

External links

www.stockholmskallan.se has formerly unknown media about Jackson Haines

1840 births
1875 deaths
American male single skaters
Sportspeople from New York City